Future Legends Complex is a  sports park that is under construction in Windsor, Colorado.

On November 30, 2020, the Orem Owlz announced that they would move to Windsor and play as the Northern Colorado Owlz starting in the 2021 season. In January 2021 they moved their start date to 2022.

It was also announced in January 2021 that Northern Colorado Hailstorm FC, a new soccer team in USL League One, will debut at Future Legends Sports Complex in 2022.

The Hailstorm and Owlz will play at TicketSmarter Stadium located in the heart of the Future Legends Complex. The stadium is expected to have a capacity of 6,500 for sporting events and over 20,000 for concerts and music performances. TicketSmarter will be the primary ticketing partner of the stadium in addition to being the title sponsor through 2032.

The 118-acre complex will feature the 6,500-seat TicketSmarter Stadium, a secondary stadium with 2,500-seat capacity, multiple baseball diamonds and multi-purpose fields, an indoor sports arena, an e-sports arena, Hilton Garden Inn and Hampton by Hilton hotels, and multiple restaurants retail locations; and will host guests for major sports tournaments, events, leagues, and more.

Construction 
The original contractor for the entire project was Hensel Phelps Construction out of Greeley, Colorado. Hensel Phelps had completed grading of the site, as well as construction of two multipurpose fields, and preliminary parking lot work. In June 2021, however, construction was ordered halted by the United States Department of Agriculture in order to conduct environmental and historical studies on the location. 

The USDA later ruled that no preservation work was necessary and that construction could resume. During this time, the general contractor changed from Hensel Phelps Construction to Jaco General Contractor of Wichita, Kansas. According to social media for the complex, foundation work had commenced by August 2021.

TicketSmarter Stadium is expected to open in 2022. The Owlz and Hailstorm will play at Jackson Field at the University of Northern Colorado until then.

References

Baseball venues in Colorado
Soccer venues in Colorado
USL League One stadiums
Northern Colorado Hailstorm FC